Żarnowiec Elektrownia Wodna is a dismantled former PKP railway station intended to serve the Żarnowiec pumped storage power station, It lies on a dismantled branch line from Rybno Kaszubskie railway station to the station intended to serve the never-completed Żarnowiec Nuclear Power Plant. The station is located in Czymanowo near Żarnowiec (Pomeranian Voivodeship), Poland.

Lines crossing the station

References 
Żarnowiec Elektrownia Wodna article at Polish Stations Database, URL accessed at 19 March 2006

Railway stations in Pomeranian Voivodeship
Disused railway stations in Pomeranian Voivodeship
Wejherowo County